is a railway station in Kita-ku, Hamamatsu,  Shizuoka Prefecture, Japan, operated by the third sector Tenryū Hamanako Railroad.

Lines
Kanasashi Station is served by the Tenryū Hamanako Line, and is located 41.9 kilometers from the starting point of the line at Kakegawa Station.

Station layout
The station has a single island platform and a two-story station building. Until 1964, an adjacent island platform to the south of the station served a spur line of the Enshū Railway. The station building, platform and water tower are protected as Registered Tangible Cultural Properties of Japan since 2011.

Adjacent stations

|-
!colspan=5|Tenryū Hamanako Railroad

Station History
Kanasashi Station was established on April 1, 1938 as the terminal station of the Japan National Railways Futamata Line. The line was further extended to Enshū-Mori Station by June 1, 1940. Scheduled freight services were discontinued from March 1985, marking the final end of all freight services on the line. After the privatization of JNR on March 15, 1987, the station came under the control of the Tenryū Hamanako Line.

Passenger statistics
In fiscal 2016, the station was used by an average of 339 passengers daily (boarding passengers only).

Surrounding area
Hamamatsu Kohoku High School
Japan National Route 362

See also
 List of Railway Stations in Japan

References

External links

  Tenryū Hamanako Railroad Station information 
 

Railway stations in Shizuoka Prefecture
Railway stations in Japan opened in 1938
Stations of Tenryū Hamanako Railroad
Railway stations in Hamamatsu